Rockfield may refer to several places:

United Kingdom
 Rockfield, Highland, Scotland
 Rockfield, Monmouthshire, Wales
 home of Rockfield Studios
 Rockfield, Swansea, Swansea, Wales
 Rockfield, County Fermanagh, a townland in County Fermanagh, Northern Ireland

United States
 Rockfield, Indiana
 Rockfield, Kentucky, an unincorporated community
 Rockfield, Wisconsin